Younghusband is a small settlement on the left bank of the lower Murray River in South Australia near Mannum. There are views of Lake Carlet from the cliffs near the caravan park.

The historic Wilhaven house in East Front Road is listed on the South Australian Heritage Register.

Younghusband is not near the similarly named Younghusband Peninsula near the Murray Mouth.

References

Towns in South Australia